Rainbow: Music of Central Asia Vol. 8 is an album by the Kronos Quartet, in collaboration with Alim & Fargana Qasimov and Homayun Sakhi. The album is released by Folkways Records as a co-production between the Smithsonian Institution and the Aga Khan Music Initiative in Central Asia.

Track listing

Credits

Musicians
David Harrington - violin
John Sherba - violin
Hank Dutt - viola
Jeffrey Zeigler - cello
Homayun Sakhi - Afghan rubab
Salar Nader - tabla
Abbos Kosimov - doyra, qayraq
Alim Qasimov - vocal (tracks 2-6)
Farghana Qasimova - vocal, daf (tracks 2-6)
Rafael Asgarov - balaban (tracks 2-6)
Rauf Islamov - kamancheh (tracks 2-6)
Ali Asgar Ammadov - tar (tracks 2-6)
Vugar Sharifzadeh - naghara (tracks 2-6)

Production
Track 1 recorded at Skywalker Sound, Lucas Valley, California, March 2009
Joel Gordon - recording engineer

Tracks 2-6 recorded at Livingston Recording Studios, London, England, September 2008
Scott Fraser - recording engineer
Joel Gordon - mastering
Sebastien Schuytser - photography
Jay Blakesberg - photography
Rachel Bleckman - photography
Aida Huseynova, Anna Oldfield - translation (Azerbeijani lyrics)

References

See also
Kronos Quartet discography

2010 albums
Kronos Quartet albums